Forrest Striplin McCartney (March 23, 1931 – July 17, 2012) was a United States Air Force lieutenant general and former director of NASA's John F. Kennedy Space Center.

McCartney was born in Fort Payne, Alabama. He graduated from Gulf Coast Military Academy in 1949, received a Bachelor of Science degree, in electrical engineering, from Alabama Polytechnic Institute, Auburn in 1952. He earned a master's degree, in nuclear engineering, from the Air Force Institute of Technology in 1955, and also graduated from the Armed Forces Staff College.

McCartney received his commission through the Reserve Officer Training Corps, and entered the regular air force in 1952. In May 1959, he was assigned to the Satellite Control Facility in Sunnyvale, California and worked on the CORONA program deploying and operating the nation's first spy satellites for the National Reconnaissance Office.

McCartney was promoted to the rank of lieutenant general on May 1, 1983, which is the rank at which he eventually retired. In 1986 he was selected, by NASA Administrator James C. Fletcher, to be the fourth director of the Kennedy Space Center. McCartney held this position from August 31, 1986, until December 31, 1991.

McCartney died in Palm Bay, Florida, on July 17, 2012, after a short illness.

References

External links
NASA biography

1931 births
2012 deaths
People from Fort Payne, Alabama
Auburn University alumni
Air Force Institute of Technology alumni
Joint Forces Staff College alumni
Recipients of the Meritorious Service Medal (United States)
Recipients of the Legion of Merit
United States Air Force generals
Recipients of the Air Force Distinguished Service Medal
Directors of the Kennedy Space Center
People from Palm Bay, Florida